The Kalamazoo Xplosion was an indoor football team based in Kalamazoo, Michigan. The Xplosion began play in 2007 expansion team of the Continental Indoor Football League. They played their home games at Wings Stadium.

History
Original team owners are Mike Johnson, Mike Trumbell, and Esteban Rivera, who also owned the Saginaw Sting.  A number of Sting players and Xplosion players indicated at the end of the 2008 season that wages were in arrears from the owners. This led to an investigation of Johnson in his role as Sting General Manager.  Trumbell, owner of Triple Threat Sports in Battle Creek, and Rivera, a Battle Creek police officer, have offered a deal to split ownership of the two teams, with Trumbell and Rivera owning the Sting, and Johnson receiving the Xplosion.

Season-By-Season 

|-
|2007 || 10 || 2 || 0 || 2nd Great Lakes || Won GLD Semifinal (Chicago)Lost GLD Championship (Michigan)
|-
|2008 || 11 || 1 || 0 || 1st Great Lakes East || Won GLD East Finals (Muskegon)Won GLD Championship (Rock River)Lost CIFL Championship (Saginaw)
|-
!Totals || 24 || 5 || 0
|colspan="2"| (including playoffs)

2007 Season Schedule

2007 CIFL Standings

2008 Season Schedule

2008 CIFL Standings

References

External links
 Official website
 Xplosion's 2007 stats

Former Continental Indoor Football League teams
American football teams in Michigan
Sports in Kalamazoo, Michigan
American football teams established in 2007
American football teams disestablished in 2008
2007 establishments in Michigan
2008 disestablishments in Michigan